Lawrence Edward Dickson (March 22, 1955 – May 2, 2019), known as Larry Dick, was an American football quarterback who played two seasons with the Saskatchewan Roughriders of the Canadian Football League. He played college football at the University of Maryland, College Park.

References

External links
Just Sports Stats
College stats

2019 deaths
1955 births
American football quarterbacks
Canadian football quarterbacks
American players of Canadian football
Maryland Terrapins football players
Saskatchewan Roughriders players